Harold Sly (26 February 1904 – 1996) was an English professional footballer of the 1920s and 1930s.

Born in Appley Bridge, he played football for the Rover Company's team before joining Birmingham, however he never started a match for the club in the English Football League, and dropped back into the amateur game with Tamworth Castle. In 1927 he joined Gillingham of the Football League Third Division South, where he spent two seasons but never secured a regular place in the club's first team. He then moved to Brighton & Hove Albion, before joining French club FC Sète.

References

1904 births
Year of death missing
People from Appley Bridge
English footballers
Association football utility players
Birmingham City F.C. players
Tamworth F.C. players
Gillingham F.C. players
Brighton & Hove Albion F.C. players
FC Sète 34 players
English Football League players
Association football fullbacks
Association football midfielders
Association football inside forwards